East Ringgold is an unincorporated community in Pickaway County, in the U.S. state of Ohio.

History
The first settlement at East Ringgold (originally called Grand View Barr) was made in the 1830s.

References

Unincorporated communities in Pickaway County, Ohio
Unincorporated communities in Ohio